Eulophonotus obesus is a moth in the family Cossidae. It is found in Sierra Leone and Togo.

References

Natural History Museum Lepidoptera generic names catalog

Zeuzerinae